Cancor (died 771) was a Frankish count associated with Lorsch Abbey. He was son of a noble lady Williswinda. As her only known husband before she was widowed was named Robert, it has been proposed that Cancor was son to Robert I, Count of Hesbaye, who was also alive in the 8th century.

In 764, together with his widowed mother Williswinda, Cancor founded Lorsch Abbey as a proprietary church and monastery on their estate, Laurissa (Lorsch). They entrusted its government to Cancor's cousin Chrodegang, Bishop of Metz. Chrodegang dedicated the church and monastery to Saint Peter and became its first abbot. The founders later enriched the new abbey by further donations.

In 766, shortly before his death, Chrodegang resigned as Abbot of Lorsch owing to his other important duties as Bishop of Metz. He then sent his brother Gundeland, another nephew of Cancor, to Lorsch as his successor.

According to one source, Cancor was probably related to the Robertians. His father's name may have been Rodbert. Robert may have been his brother or his nephew.

Cancor married a noblewoman named Angila, of unknown parentage, probably before 766.  Cancor and Angila had four children:
 Heimrich, Count in the Upper Rheingau (d. 5 May 795), Count in the Upper Rheingau, who died in the Battle of Lüne and the Elbe, a campaign in Charlemagne’s Saxon Wars
 Embert (d. 803), Bishop of Worms, 770-803
 Rachilt (d. after 1 November 792), Nun at Lorsch
 Euphemia, Nun at Lorsch.

Cancor was succeeded as Count of Hesbaye by his brother Thuringbert.

References

Sources

Chrondegand, in The Catholic Encyclopedia (1913)

Robertians
Counts of Hesbaye
8th-century Frankish nobility
771 deaths